Claudio de la Torre (born 22 November 1980) is a Venezuelan male model and actor.

Biography
Claudio rose to fame in 2004 after participating in the Mister Venezuela competition representing Anzoátegui State. During the competition, he emerged as the third finalist. After the competition, he decided to venture into acting and joined the popular acting school Luz Columba where he trained under professor Nelson Ortega. While trying to get television roles, he continued with his modelling until he obtained his first television role in 2009 in the Venevisión telenovela Tomasa Tequiero.

In 2011, he played the supporting role of Enmanuel Madero in the successful telenovela La viuda joven.

In 2014, he was cast to participate in the upcoming telenovela Amor Secreto to be produced by Venevisión.

Telenovelas

Theater
 Los hombres no mienten (2013)
 Malos entendidos (2014)
 Crónicas Desquiciadas (2015)

References

External links
 

1980 births
Venezuelan male models
Venezuelan male telenovela actors
Living people